WQCD may refer to:

 WQCD (AM), a radio station (1550 AM) licensed to Delaware, Ohio, United States
 WYNY (AM), a radio station (1450 AM) licensed to Millford, Pennsylvania, United States; formerly WQCD
 WPUT (FM), a radio station (90.1 FM) licensed to serve North Salem, New York, United States, which held the call sign WQCD from 2014 to 2015
 WJZZ (FM), a radio station (88.1 FM) licensed to serve Montgomery, New York, which held the call sign WQCD in 2014
 WFAN-FM, a radio station (101.9 FM) licensed to serve New York, New York, which held the call sign WQCD from 1988 to 2008

See also

 
 KQCD
 QCD (disambiguation)